Joe McNally (born  1964) is a former Gaelic footballer who played for the St Anne's club and at senior level for the Dublin county team. He was awarded an All Star in 1983 for his performances with Dublin. He won an All-Ireland Minor medal with Dublin as a goalkeeper in 1982 and a senior medal as a corner forward in 1983. He is the only player in the history of Gaelic football to win an All-Ireland Minor medal and Senior medal in successive years. The St Anne's man won titles for his club, county, province and country. A prolific goalscorer, he contributed 26 goals for Dublin in league and championship.

References

External links
 Article on the Summer of 83'

1960s births
Living people
Dublin inter-county Gaelic footballers
Gaelic football forwards
Gaelic football goalkeepers
St Anne's (Dublin) Gaelic footballers
Winners of one All-Ireland medal (Gaelic football)